Changde is a prefecture-level city in the northwest of Hunan province, People's Republic of China. In addition to the urban districts, Changde also administers the county-level city of Jinshi and six counties. Changde is adjacent to Dongting Lake to the east, the city of Yiyang to the south, Wuling and Xuefeng Mountains to the west, and Hubei province to the north.

The area has been inhabited by humans since around 8,000 years ago. In that time, the city has changed names several times, but it has been known as Changde since the 12th century. The city is well known for the Battle of Changde during the Second Sino-Japanese War (1937–45) and the atrocities committed then by the Imperial Japanese Army.

In the past decade, the city has seen a massive construction boom. New highrises have sprung up, roads were rebuilt and new schools, parks and museums have opened. Locals and tourists often visit the Changde Poetry Wall, covered in a variety of poems mostly from ancient China. The wall stretches for  along the Yuan River downtown and functions as a flood wall. It is listed in the Guinness Book of World Records as the longest wall with engraved arts in the world.

History

Prehistory
Changde is known for its many Paleolithic and Neolithic sites. About 500 of them have been discovered to date. In 1984 neolithic human settlements were discovered in Li County, part of Changde. In 1988, the Pengtoushan site was excavated leading to the identification of the "Pengtoushan Culture". The site contains the earliest evidence of a settled village yet discovered in China. Archeological research from 2011 suggests that a settlement called Shanlonggang, part of the Pengtoushan civilization, may have cultivated rice 8,000-9,000 years ago, making it the possible birthplace of rice cultivation.

Ancient history

In historical times it was also a centre from which governments controlled the mountain tribes of western Hunan. A county named Linyuan was established there in the 2nd century BC.

In the Han Dynasty the area was called "Wuling County". The name is retained in the urban Wuling District. In the Sui Dynasty, it was called Langzhou. During the Song Dynasty, it was called Dingcheng. In the Tang Dynasty (618–907) it became the seat of Lang prefecture. In 1117, Changde county was established, and around 1165,Changde superior prefecture/fu was established. The name Changde has been used for the city ever since. This status was retained until 1912, when the superior prefecture was abolished and the city became a county seat.

19th and early 20th centuries
In the late 19th century Changde became a prosperous commercial center and the chief agricultural central market of the Yuan River basin. Many Chinese firms, and — after 1905, when it was opened to foreign trade — foreign firms as well, maintained branches there to buy rice, cotton, tung oil, and timber, so that Changde's economic influence reached out into northern Guizhou, southwestern Hubei, and parts of southeastern Sichuan province. The merchants of the Taho quarter of the city controlled much of the northwestern Hunan economy, and early in the 20th century Changde was the second city of Hunan, after Changsha.

Second World War

In the 1943 Battle of Changde, the Kuomintang's National Revolutionary Army attempted to stop the invading Imperial Japanese Army from completing their invasion of Sichuan. Frustrated, the Japanese side employed chemical weapons to clear their way. During the Khabarovsk War Crime Trials, proof was presented of operations to contaminate the area with plague as early as 1941 and 1942.

People's Republic
Although the commercial dominance of Changde firms disappeared with the advent of communist rule in 1949, the city remained an important center of trade, with the majority of its population engaged either in commerce or in transportation.

In 1975, Changde was hit by Typhoon Nina.

Geography

Located on the Yuan River upstream from its junction with the Lake Dongting system, Changde is a natural center of the northwest Hunan plain. The city was historically situated on the north bank of the Yuan River, and has since expanded development south of the river. The Chinese phrase "" (literally "Three mountains and three rivers") is often used in reference to the general physical geography of the city. Around the city are three nearby mountains- Taiyang Mountain to the north, Mount De to the south, and Mount Hefu in the west. In addition to the Yuan River, the city has plentiful water resources with the Chuanzi and Xin Rivers both flowing through Wuling urban district. The other major geographic feature of the area is Liuye Lake, to the northeast of the city center. There are also numerous lakes, ponds, and streams in the city although many have been diverted or buried.

The larger prefecture-level city of Changde is adjacent to Dongting Lake to the east, the city of Yiyang to the south, Wuling and Xuefeng Mountains to the west, and Hubei province to the north.

The Xuefeng and Wuling mountains have historically been part of the native habitat of the South China tiger. This species is critically endangered and believed to be extinct in the wild. In recent years, the Chinese government has worked to identify potential sites for the establishment of a tiger reserve for the reintroduction of captive-born tigers into the wild. Hupingshan-Houhe National Natural Reserve Complex in Shimen county was selected as one of several potential sites.

Climate
It has a monsoon-influenced, four-season humid subtropical climate (Köppen Cfa), with cool, damp winters, and hot, humid summers. Winter begins relatively dry but not sunny and becomes progressively damper and cloudier; spring brings frequent rain and the highest humidity levels of the year. Summer is comparatively sunny, while autumn is somewhat dry. With monthly percent possible sunshine ranging from 22% in February and March to 53% in July, the city receives 1,602 hours of bright sunshine annually.

Administrative divisions
The municipal executive, legislature and judiciary is in Wuling District, together with the city's Communist Party headquarters and Public security bureau. Wuling sits on the left bank of the Yuan River. Opposite Wuling is the administrative centre for Dingcheng District.

Changde prefecture-level city oversees two districts, one county-level city and six counties :

Economy
Tobacco is the most important industry in Changde. Changde Cigarette Factory (CDCF), now a subsidiary of China Tobacco Hunan Industrial Co., Ltd., is one of six key cigarette companies in China and employs 8,300 workers in Changde . CDCF is by far Changde's largest industrial concern accounting for 4.22 billion (51.2%) of the city's 8.2 billion total industrial value added in 2012.  Changde is also an administrative centre and a storage and shipping point for tung oil, grain, cotton, medicinal herbs, and wood. Manufactures include ceramics, machine tools, textiles, leather, and processed foods. Grain, oil, cotton, and other commodities are loaded into medium-sized ships and taken to Yueyang, Changsha, or Hankou (Wuhan, Hubei province) for onward shipment. Timber is also rafted there and floated across Lake Dongting to Yueyang, and thus to the Yangtze River. After 1949 the city developed some light industry, mostly based on such local products as wood, leather, and bristles.

Demographics

Changde is the fifth most populous prefecture-level division in Hunan (after Changsha, Hengyang, Shaoyang and Yongzhou), with a total population of 5,279,102 inhabitants as of the 2020 Chinese census, of which 1,469,055 reside in the built-up area (metro) made of Dingcheng and Wuling Districts. As of the 2010 Chinese census 13.23% of the population was found to be under 15 years old, while the population over 65 comprised 11.43% of the total.

Ethnic minorities
The Tujia people are native to Shimen county, having occupied parts of the area for over 2000 years. Other significant ethnic minority populations in Changde include the Hui, Uyghur, Miao and Zhuang peoples. Fengshu Hui and Uyghur Autonomous Township in Taoyuan County is the largest Uyghur community outside of Xinjiang Uyghur Autonomous Region. Fengshu is one of four Hui and Uyghur Autonomous Townships in Changde. The other three are Qinglin also in Taoyuan county, Xujiaqiao in Dingcheng district, and Maojiatan in Hanshou county. Changde has the largest Hui population in the province. Minority ethnicities represented 7.2% of the total population of Changde in 2010, 0.8% less than in 2000. By far the largest group of ethnic minority residents is the Tujia with 361,200 people or approximately 6.3% of the total population. The Tujia made up over half the population of Shimen county . As for the other major minority ethnic groups present in Changde, the Hui, Uyghur, Miao, and Zhuang peoples respectively comprise 0.5% (33,500 people), 0.08% (4,800 people), 0.08% (4,500 people), and 0.02% (1,300 people) of the total population of Changde.

Language
People of Changde do not speak Hunanese, the locals speak the Chang–He 常鹤 dialect of Southwestern Mandarin.

Government

The current CPC Party Secretary of Changde is Zhou Derui and the current Mayor is Cao Lijun.

Culture

Dialect
The Changde dialect is a variety of Southwestern Mandarin. As such, it lacks the retroflex consonants found in Standard Chinese. Changde dialect adds the initial consonant /ŋ/ not present in standard Chinese. In addition, /n/ and /l/ are merged. The dialect has the same four tones as standard Chinese.

Media
Changde has two major daily newspapers, the Changde Daily and the Changde Evening News, both published by Changde Daily Media Group. The Changde Livelihood Newspaper is published every Monday, Wednesday and Friday by Changde City Broadcasting Department which also manages Changde's local television and radio. The five local television networks run by Changde Television (HNCDTV), a sub-division of Changde City Department of Broadcasting, are Changde News Channel, Changde Public Channel, Changde City Channel, Changde Wuling Channel, and Changde Teletext Channel. The department of broadcasting also manages Changde People's Radio Traffic Channel (97.1 FM) and Changde People's Radio News Channel (105.6 FM).

Changde Uyghur culture

Taoyuan county's Uyghur community is culturally distinct from the Uyghur communities of Xinjiang. While Islam plays a central role in Xinjiang Uyghur culture, Islam and religious orthodoxy are much less prominent in Changde Uyghur culture. In particular, young Changde Uyghurs often do not practice Islam and consume pork, strictly forbidden among Xinjiang Uyghurs and Muslims in general, but common for the Han Chinese. In addition, the Changde Uyghurs speak Chinese instead of Uyghur. Those who practice Islam also learn Arabic for religious purposes.

Local food and beverage
Drinking Lei cha, a beverage made from tea and other dry ingredients ground together and steeped in boiled water, is popular in Changde, especially in the urban districts of Wuling and Dingcheng and Taoyuan and Hanshou counties. Wuling Lei cha, as the Changde variety is sometimes called, is usually made with sesame, peanut, meng bean, rice, tea and ginger. According to legend, the custom of drinking lei cha began in Changde over two thousand years ago when general Ma Yuan and his army passed through Wuling county, where Changde is now located. There was a sudden epidemic in the barracks which they were only able to cure with a home remedy given to Ma Yuan by a mysterious old lady. Lei cha has been popular in the region ever since.

Arts
In the 17th century, folk music from Jiangsu and Zhejiang provinces began influencing the popular music scene in Changde's Yuan and Li river district. A unique style of theatrical folk music called Changde Sixian (lit. "Changde strings") evolved from this combination. It includes short expressive sections of lyrics spoken and sung in turns in Changde dialect by a group of singers accompanied by traditional Chinese stringed instruments such as the yangqin, pipa, sanxian, and huqin. The traditional repertoire has over 100 songs, most of which are based on history or folklore. After the founding of the People's Republic a modern socialist realist repertoire emerged. Changde Sixian has been revitalized since the 1980s with several songs receiving national awards. The style has also attracted some international attention since a visiting performance by a Changde Sixian troupe to Malaysia. In 2006, the State Council included Changde Sixian in its first national intangible cultural heritage list.

Transportation
Changde has an extensive bus network with most short-distance busses within the city costing either CN¥1 or ¥1.50 depending on air-conditioning. Changde is a pedestrian friendly city with wide tree-lined avenues and streets.

Intercity rail
The city is connected to the national passenger rail network, with connections to other Chinese cities via Changde Railway Station in Wuling district. Train tickets can be purchased at the station, before departure or once on the train. A planned high-speed Chongqing-Changsha special passenger line will connect Changde with Chongqing, Changsha and other cities along the line at  once completed. The Qianjiang-Zhangjiajie-Changde section has been approved and is expected to begin construction in 2014. The Changde-Changsha section has already begun construction.

Bus rapid transit
On December 26, 2012, Changde officially launched its bus rapid transit (BRT) system. As of July 2013, the BRT system in Changde has eight lines operating both inside and outside BRT roads. These include the H1 main line running from Changde Bus Station to Deshan Bus Station and seven branch lines, H11, H12, H13, H15, H16, L12, and L13 although there are a total of only 24 BRT stations in the city. The system operates on the same flat fare as the city's normal innercity bus network, charging ¥1 yuan for transit between any two stops on the line except in the summer when the fare increases to ¥1.50. Changde BRT uses Huanghai CNG busses. The stations are located in the center of the roadway.

Public bike service

Changde also has a public bike service begun in October 2012 with 30 rental stations throughout the city and a thousand bicycles. The system has continued to expand and plans at least a 120 rental stations and 3,200 bicycles by 2015. It is the second such system to be implemented in Hunan province  after a similar bike rental program was begun in Zhuzhou in May 2011.

Road
 China National Highway 207
G55 Erenhot–Guangzhou Expressway
 G5513 Changsha–Zhangjiajie Expressway
 G56 Hangzhou–Ruili Expressway

Air
Changde Taohuayuan Airport (CGD) was constructed in 1958 and links Changde with several other Chinese cities including Haikou, Beijing, Shanghai, Kunming, Shenzhen, Guangzhou, Nanjing, Tianjin, Liuzhou, Chongqing, and Wuhan.

Water
Since the Yuan river has a minimum channel depth of over two meters year-round, it is navigable by thousand-ton ships. Yuanguan port in Changde is the second largest port in Hunan province covering an area of 200 mu (13 hectares). Construction of the new port began in 1999 and the first and second stages were completed in 2008 with two thousand-ton berths, two five-hundred-ton berths and one three-hundred-ton berth. Since 2012, The port of Changde is linked directly to the port of Shanghai.

Tourism

Changde is home to several tourist attractions. A few of them are located within the city but the most important of them are in the counties outside the city. Inside the city tourist areas include Liuye Lake, Taiyang Mountain, Changde Poetry Wall, and Walking street. Liuye Lake is now a national AAA tourism area with facilities for local, national, and international sporting events such as the 8th Asian Rowing Championship. The lake is an important recreation area for the city.

Outside the city in Taoyuan county is the famous Taohuayuan or "Peach Blossom Spring" in English, named after the fable by Tao Yuanming. The area is famous for its plentiful peach blossoms and natural scenery.

Education

Changde is home to several institutions of higher education.
 Hunan University of Arts and Science
 Changde Vocational and Technical College
 Changde Financial and Economic School

Notable people
 Chen Sisi - Vice-president of the Central Military Commission Political Work Department Song and Dance Troupe born in 1976 
 Ding Ling - Modern author born in Linli county, Changde in 1904
 Jian Bozan - Marxist historian born in Taoyuan county, Chandge in 1898
 Lin Boqu - Prominent early leader of the Chinese Communist Party born in Shujing, Linli county, Changde in 1886
 Liu Yuxi - famous Tang Dynasty poet worked as a minor government official in Changde (then Langzhou) for nine years
 Song Jiaoren - Revolutionary political leader and founding member of the Kuomintang born in Taoyuan county, Changde in 1882
 Ying Er - Actress
 Yuan Chunqing - Party Chief of Shanxi province and former governor of Shaanxi province born in Hanshou county, Changde in 1952
 Xiang Xiang - Pop singer whose career began in 2004 born in Taoyuan county, Changde in 1984
 Zhang Lu - People's Liberation Army Astronaut Corps astronaut

International relations

Twin towns – sister cities
Changde is twinned with:
  Yolo County, United States
  Apaxco, Mexico
  Hanover, Germany
  Anuradhapura, Sri Lanka
  Ipswich, Australia
  Higashiōmi, Japan

See also
 List of twin towns and sister cities in China

Notes and references

External links

 Government webportal of Changde

 
Prefecture-level divisions of Hunan